Yemen is a country on the Arabian Peninsula, and the music of Yemen is primarily known abroad for a series of pan-Arab popular stars and the Yemenite Jews who became musical stars in Israel during the 20th century. In the Arab world, Yemen has long been a cultural capital.

Yemen's national anthem is "United Republic", written by Abdallah "al-Fadhool" Abdulwahab Noman.

UNESCO proclaimed the tradition of poetic songs of Sana'a, called al-Ghina al-San'ani, a Masterpiece of the Oral and Intangible Heritage of Humanity on 7 November 2003.

Folk music

Traditional Yemeni music is usually performed in the home, in a window-lined room at the top of the house called a mafraj during a khat chew, in which the performers chew a mildly psychoactive stimulant leaf. This form of performance uses sung poetry and is called homayni; it is a tradition that dates to the 14th century. Two of the most famous Yemeni musicians, Ahmed Fathey and Osama al Attar, are now resident in the United Arab Emirates. The urban homayni style known in the capital of Yemen, Sanaan singing, is the most well-known kind of homayni today .
There is a large Yemeni-Welsh community in Cardiff and other major Welsh cities. Yemeni folk music has thus become a major part of the Welsh music scene.

Rap music

Rap and Hip-hop Culture existed as early as 2005 but it only achieved widespread popularity in 2008 when the Hip-hop in Yemen took a leap forward and began to spread around the youth of Yemen, especially in Sana'a and Aden.

The hip hop major outbreak in Yemen is often associated to the influence of Hajaj Abdulqawi Masaed (also graphed as Hagage Masaed or best known as "AJ"), an American-Yemeni rapper producing music since 1997. Although he had grown in the United States, AJ has successfully reached Yemeni audience by addressing to local issues and incorporating traditional musical language into his hits. This versatility was also one of the reasons he drew international recognition, since he entered in the Yemeni music scene, he has been partnering up with several Yemeni artists, such as Hussein Muhib, Fuad Al-Kibisi, Fuad Al-Sharjabi, Ibrahim Al-Taefi, Abdurahman Al-Akhfash and others, and helping new ones to develop their talents. He has also played a major role on propagating the understanding of rap as a means of change.

One contributing factor to the development of the music is also the creation of Yemen Music House in 2007 that has been providing assets to the development of a contemporary music scene. In 2009, took place the first Yemeni Rap public festival, co-sponsored by the French and German foreign-missions. Due to the importance of this event, AJ draws a comparison between it and the fall of the Berlin wall.

References
Notes

Sources
 Badley, Bill. "Sounds of the Arabian Peninsula". 2000. In Broughton, Simon and Ellingham, Mark with McConnachie, James and Duane, Orla (Ed.), World Music, Vol. 1: Africa, Europe and the Middle East, pp 351–354. Rough Guides Ltd, Penguin Books. 
 Yemeni Sacred Music at rootsworld.com